Lukáš Jendrek (born 29 November 2002) is a Slovak footballer who plays as a left back for 1. FC Tatran Prešov.

Honours
Spartak Trnava
Slovak Cup: 2021–22

References

External links
 Futbalnet profile
 Spartak Trnava profile
 

2002 births
Living people
Sportspeople from Prešov
Slovak footballers
Slovakia youth international footballers
Association football defenders
FC Spartak Trnava players
FC Petržalka players
1. FC Tatran Prešov players
Slovak Super Liga players
2. Liga (Slovakia) players